The brown-backed whistler (Pachycephala modesta) is a species of bird in the family Pachycephalidae  endemic to New Guinea. Its natural habitat is subtropical or tropical moist montane forests.

Taxonomy and systematics
The brown-backed whistler was originally described in the genus Poecilodryas.

Subspecies 
Three subspecies are recognized:
 P. m. hypoleuca – Reichenow, 1915: Originally described as a separate species. Found in east-central New Guinea
 P. m. modesta – (De Vis, 1894): Found in southeast New Guinea
 P. m. telefolminensis – Gilliard & LeCroy, 1961: Found in central New Guinea

References

brown-backed whistler
Birds of Papua New Guinea
Endemic fauna of New Guinea
brown-backed whistler
Taxonomy articles created by Polbot